The 2005 International Rules Series was the 12th annual International Rules Series and the 14th time that a test series of international rules football was played between Ireland and Australia and was won by Australia.

The 2005 series involved two test matches in Australia, the first in Perth (which was a sell-out) and a second test in Melbourne which was controversial due to the on field actions of the Australian team.

Previous series 
Starting with the first official senior-level International Rules Series was played between players from the Australian rules football leagues and the Gaelic Athletic Association in 1984, the Irish had won 7 of the previous series to Australia's 6. Coming into the series, the Irish held the Cormac McAnallen Cup after their 2004 whitewash of the Australians at Croke Park in Dublin.

2005 series 
The Melbourne test was played at the Telstra Dome rather than the Melbourne Cricket Ground, unlike previous series in Australia, since the MCG was preparing to host the 2006 Commonwealth Games. By 1 August 2005, a vast majority of the tickets for the Perth test had been sold. When the matches were last played in Australia in 2003, over 100,000 people attended the two tests in Perth and Melbourne, underscoring the popularity of the series with Australian football fans.

The Ireland team was managed by former County Down manager Pete McGrath, an All Ireland winning manager, while the AFL appointed long-serving Essendon coach Kevin Sheedy as its new head coach, to replace Garry Lyon, who had been in charge of the Australians from 2001 to 2004.

The Irish suffered a blow to their attempt to retain the cup when Sydney Swans backfielder and team mainstay Tadhg Kennelly (originally from County Kerry) was unable for selection due to a nagging ankle injury that he was playing through during the Swans' run to the AFL premiership. In a departure from previous years, the Australians selected a team specifically for these games, rather than giving automatic selection to members of the All Australian Team. Another Irishman who has played in the AFL, Jim Stynes, assisted with selection and planning, giving insight into the Irish game as he has in previous years.

The series was comprehensively won by the Australians. In the first test, they outplayed the Irish in all aspects of the game, including speed and kicking the round ball, which are traditionally strengths of the Irish players. Kicking 2 goals and 27 overs, Australia became the first team to score 100 points in an international rules test. Australian umpire Mathew James attracted some criticism from the Irish press for applying the 20 metre penalty rule more strictly than expected by the Irish.

The Irish team was more competitive in the second test, in which there were several brawls and Australian captain Chris Johnson was sent off. However, they still lost by 21 points, meaning that Australia won the series on aggregate by 57 points.

Fixtures 
 First test: 21 October 2005 at Subiaco Oval, Perth, WA
 Second test: 28 October 2005 at Telstra Dome, Melbourne, VIC

Squads 

1 – Australia named McLeod and Johnson as co-captains for the side.
² – Withdrawal replacement for Essendon's Matthew Lloyd.
³ – Officially ruled out for the first Test.

Matches

First test (21 October)

Second test (28 October)

See also 
 International Rules football
 Gaelic football
 Australian rules football
 Comparison of Australian rules football and Gaelic football

References

External links 

 Video of Rough play during the 2005 series from YouTube
 World Footy News (WFN) – International Rules
 AFL page on International Rules

International Rules Series
International Rules Series
International Rules series
International sports competitions hosted by Australia